Shahnavaz may refer to:
 Shahnavaz-e Olya
 Shahnavaz-e Sofla
 Shahnavaz-e Vosta